Anarchism in Austria-Hungary may refer to a number of anarchist movements in the former territory of Austria-Hungary:

Anarchism in Austria
Anarchism in Bosnia and Herzegovina
Anarchism in Croatia
Anarchism in the Czech Republic
Anarchism in Hungary